The Flintstones' 25th Anniversary Celebration is a 1986 American live-action/animated television special produced by Hanna-Barbera Productions in association with Robert Guenette Productions, which premiered on CBS on May 20, 1986. Hosted by special guests Tim Conway, Harvey Korman, and Vanna White, the program commemorated the 25th anniversary of television's first prime time animated series The Flintstones featuring clips from the show's many episodes and its spin-offs with new animation and musical segments.

Voice cast
Henry Corden as Fred Flintstone
Jean Vander Pyl as Wilma Flintstone
Daws Butler as Yogi Bear, Huckleberry Hound, Quick Draw McGraw

Special appearances

Joseph Barbera
William Hanna
The cast of Kate & Allie: Susan Saint James, Jane Curtin, Ari Meyers, Allison Smith, Frederick Koehler
Ed McMahon
Telly Savalas
Sting
Dr. Ruth Westheimer (Dr. Ruth)

Production credits
Executive Producers: William Hanna and Joseph Barbera
Co-Executive Producer: Joe Taritero
Director: Robert Guenette
Producers: Robert Guenette, Peter Wood
Writers: Tom Ruegger, John K. Ludin, Charles M. Howell IV
Animation Producer: Gerard Baldwin
Casting Director: Andrea Romano
Production Manager: Bob Stein
Creative Design: Iwao Takamoto
Art Director: William Bonnert
Editor: Peter Wood
Starring Tim Conway, Harvey Korman, Vanna White
Voices Henry Corden, Jean Vander Pyl, Daws Butler 
Associate Producer: Fred Rosen
RGP Post Production Supervisor: Bruce Helper
Musical Director: Hoyt Curtin
Music Arrangers: Tom Worrat, Ron Jones
Music Coordinator: Joanne Miller
Music Editors: Terry W. Moore, Dennis McLean, Joe Sandusky
Boom Operator: Andy Robins
Sound Effects: Mike Deneck
Photography: Tom Harvey
Video Tape: Ron Stutzman
Animator: Gordon Hunt
Animation Directors: Frank Andrina, Oliver "Lefty" Callahan, Robert Goe, Richard Leon, Jay Sarbry
Animation Background Supervisor: Al Gmuer
Animation Background Artists: Jonathan Goley, Bill Proctor, Gloria Wood
Layout Supervisor: Charles Grosvenor
Ink and Paint Supervisor: Allison Leopold
Xerography Supervisor: Star Wirth
Layout Artist: Andrew Gentle
Supervising Animation Film Editor: Larry C. Cowan
Dubbing Supervisor: Pat Foley
Sound Editors: Michael Bradley, David M. Cowan, Michele Iverson, Catherine McKenzie, Mary Gleason Pawlick, Jerry Winicki
Post Production Supervisor: Joed Eaton
Negative Consultant: William E. DeBoer
Sound Direction: Alvy Dorman, Phil Flad, C.S.A.
New Animation Produced In Association With: Wang Film Productions Co., Ltd., Cuckoo's Nest Studios
Animation Production Supervisor: Bob Marples
Animation Supervisor: Janine Dawson 
FLINTSTONES clips courtesy of: General Mills, Inc.
Production Executive: Terry Clotiaux
Executives in Charge of Animation Production: Jayne Barbera, Jean MacCurdy

Nielsen ratings
The special brought in an 11.2 rating and a 19 share, coming in third in its timeslot, and ranking 39th out of 62 programs airing that week.

References

External links

1986 television specials
CBS television specials
CBS original programming
1980s American television specials
1980s American animated films
American films with live action and animation
1980s animated television specials
The Flintstones television specials
Hanna-Barbera television specials
Television shows directed by Robert Guenette